Lee Hoe-Yeong or Lee Hoe-Young, also known by his pen name Woodang, (March 17, 1867 – November 17, 1932) was a Korean independence activist, anarchist and one of the founders of Shinheung Military Academy (Hangul: 신흥 무관 학교) in Manchuria. He used his entire fortune worth about two trillion won (1.7 billion dollars) in today's value to fight against the Japanese occupation of Korea. He is the elder brother of Lee Si-Yeong, a future Vice President of the Republic of Korea.

Born in a renowned noble family, GyeongJu Lee Clan, in which his ancestors were appointed governmental officials during the Joseon Dynasty, he and his brothers (with the exception of his eldest brother) decided to flee Korea, rather than to become subjects of oppression. His siblings are:

 Lee Gun-yeong (이건영,李健榮)  (1853–1940)– First and eldest brother
 Lee Seok-yeong  (이석영,李石榮)  (1855–1934)– Second brother, died of starvation in Shanghai, China
 Lee Cheol-yeong (이철영,李哲榮) (1863–1925)– Third brother
 Lee Si-yeong (이시영,李始榮) (1868–1953)– Fifth brother
 Lee Ho-yeong  (이호영,李護榮) (?-1933)– Sixth and youngest brother. He and his family went missing in 1933, never to be heard of again.

When Lee arrived in China, he stayed in Manchuria before moving to Beijing and later Shanghai.

Lee was arrested upon arrival from Shanghai at Dalian, and later imprisoned in the infamous Lushun Prison until his death. He died on November 17, 1932. The cause of his death was a mystery, and the Japanese authority claims that he had hanged himself on the window bars of a police station, using a hemp cloth. The Japanese' claim was refuted by Koreans, who claimed Lee was killed by the Japanese. Upon his death, his body was cremated on the same day; the ashes were later brought back to Japanese-occupied Korea, and finally re-interred at Seoul National Cemetery, years after Korean independence.

Lee was posthumously awarded with the Order of Merit for National Foundation in 1962. In 2000, the Chinese government proclaimed him as a "Patriotic martyr of the anti-imperialism/anti-Japanese revolution" for his struggle against Japanese imperialism in China.

In 2010, a five-part drama series was aired by KBS to commemorate of his struggle, titled Freedom Fighter, Lee Hoe Young(자유인 이회영).  The series aired on 29 August 2010, the date of the centenary of the Annexation of Korea by Japan.

Popular culture
 Portrayed by Jung Dong-hwan in the 2010 KBS TV series Freedom Fighter, Lee Hoe-young.

See also 

 Korean independence movement

References

External links
 Woodang Memorial Hall 

1867 births
1932 deaths
People from Seoul
Korean Empire people
Korean independence activists
Korean politicians
Korean educators
Korean anarchists
Korean revolutionaries
Korean torture victims
Korean people who died in prison custody
Recipients of the Order of Merit for National Foundation
Murdered anarchists